Bernadette Wicki (born 30 June 1968) is a Swiss rower. She competed in the women's double sculls event at the 2000 Summer Olympics.

References

External links
 

1968 births
Living people
Swiss female rowers
Olympic rowers of Switzerland
Rowers at the 2000 Summer Olympics
Sportspeople from Nidwalden